Baofeng railway station is a railway station in Baofeng County, Pingdingshan, Henan, China. It is an intermediate stop on the Jiaozuo–Liuzhou railway and the western terminus of the Mengmiao–Baofeng railway.

History
The station opened on 19 June 1970. On 18 January 2008, the name of this station was changed from Baofeng to Pingdingshan West. On 15 July 2019, the name was reverted to Baofeng. The name Pingdingshan West was subsequently taken by a station on the Zhengzhou–Wanzhou high-speed railway which opened on 1 December.

References

Railway stations in Henan
Railway stations in China opened in 1970